Emmert Laurson Wingert (April 2, 1899 – February 1, 1971) was an American lawyer and judge from Wisconsin.  He was a justice of the Wisconsin Supreme Court and executive counsel to Governor Walter J. Kohler, Sr.

Biography

Born in Mount Carroll, Illinois, Wingert graduated from Harvard Law School. He practiced law in Madison, Wisconsin, worked in office of the Wisconsin Attorney General, and was executive counsel to Walter J. Kohler, Sr., when he was Governor of Wisconsin. During Kohler's term, Wingert represented Wisconsin at the National Conference on Uniform State Laws.  Years later, under Kohler's son, Governor Walter J. Kohler, Jr., Wingert was Vice Chairman of the Governor's Commission on the Study of Retirement Systems, and, after the death of Justice Edward J. Gehl, in 1956, Governor Kohler appointed Wingert to the Wisconsin Supreme Court. Wingert was defeated in his first Supreme Court election, in April 1958, and left office at the end of his term, on January 1, 1959.

Electoral history

| colspan="6" style="text-align:center;background-color: #e9e9e9;"| General Election, April 1, 1958

Notes

People from Mount Carroll, Illinois
Harvard Law School alumni
Wisconsin lawyers
Justices of the Wisconsin Supreme Court
1899 births
1971 deaths
20th-century American judges
20th-century American lawyers